George Henry Jarvis (3 December 1889 – 1969) was a Scottish footballer who played in the Football League for Stoke.

Career
Born in Glasgow, Jarvis started his football career at Scottish Junior sides Glasgow Benburb and Cambuslang Rangers before joining Celtic. He spent most of his at Celtic time out on loan at a number of clubs including Motherwell, Vale of Leven, Ayr United, Clyde, St Mirren, Falkirk and Stevenston United.

Jarvis joined English Football League club Stoke in 1919 where he played at centre forward during the 1919–20 season and he went on to score ten goals. He returned to Scotland with in 1921 Clydebank after suffering from homesickness. He went on to play for Dunfermline Athletic, Ayr United and Ayr Fort.

Career statistics
Source:

References

Scottish footballers
Celtic F.C. players
Stoke City F.C. players
Cambuslang Rangers F.C. players
English Football League players
1889 births
1969 deaths
Association football forwards
Footballers from Glasgow
Benburb F.C. players
Motherwell F.C. players
Vale of Leven F.C. players
Ayr United F.C. players
Clyde F.C. players
St Mirren F.C. players
Falkirk F.C. players
Clydebank F.C. (1914) players
Dunfermline Athletic F.C. players
Scottish Junior Football Association players
Scottish Football League players